This article is about the history of Lobos, a city in the .

In 1740 a Jesuit mission led by Reverend Father Kalkner surveyed the centre and south of the province of Buenos Aires and thus picked up some geographic information on the area.  In 1772, thanks to Falkner's notes a map of the region was printed in London. The map contained the inscription Laguna de Lobos ("Lagoon of Wolves" in Spanish) below the drawing of the lagoon.

It is said that the name Lobos stems from the number of otters that at that time populated the lagoon and were known as lobos de agua ("water wolves") or lobos de río ("river wolves"); however, there are historians who believe Lobos had been given this name due to the wild dogs staying around and because they bore a resemblance to wolves.

By 1779 several guards settled down in the area and several forts, fortresses and military positions were built to form a defensive wall against the natives. These positions were set up by the order of Viceroy Juan José de Vértiz y Salcedo and were named Chascomús, Ranchos, Monte, Lobos, Navarro, Areco and Rojas.

On August 21, 1779 Gunnery Sergeant Pedro Rodríguez concluded the construction of the main parts of the fort San Pedro de Los Lobos, over the eastern bank of the Lagoon about 300 meters from its shoreline and nearly 1,500 meters east of the mouth of Las Garzas stream, finishing the work Lieutenant Bernardo Serrano had begun.

By late 1800 José Salgado and his wife Pascuala Rivas de Salgado were granted an area to colonize as a donation made by Viceroy Vértiz.  They founded Pago de Los Lobos on June 2, 1802.

Their Christian faith inspired them to build a straw-and-mud oratory, with the prompting of Nuestra Señora del Carmen; the Chapel was finished in June 1803.  José García Miranda was the first priest doctor. The chapel became the urban core of Lobos.

The current church was opened in 1906 by Monsignor Terreno, bishop of La Plata and was completed in 1912.  In the church lies the remains of the founder José Salgado, Colonel Domingo S. Arévalo, soldier of the Independence and parish priests Enrique Ferroni, José Albertini and Emilio Larumbe.

The church measures 49 × 19 m and has a capacity of 2,000 people. The tower is 37 meters tall. The main altar is made up of Carrara marble.

External links
Lobos City Hall (in Spanish)
INFOLOBOS (in Spanish) - The first digital newspaper in Lobos, with information on tourism, culture, social news, police news, sports, etc.

Lobos
Lobos

es:Historia de Lobos